The Trans-European conventional rail network, together with the Trans-European high-speed rail network, make up the Trans-European Rail network, which in turn is one of a number of the European Union's Trans-European transport networks (TEN-T). It was defined by the Council Directive 2001/16/EC of 19 March 2001.

The aim of this EU Directive is to achieve the interoperability of the European conventional rail network at the various stages of its design, construction and operation.

The network is defined as a system consisting of a set of infrastructures, fixed installations, logistic equipment and rolling stock.

By definition of the EC decision, the conventional rail network may be subdivided into the following categories:
 lines intended for passenger services
 lines intended for mixed traffic (passengers and freight)
 lines specially designed or upgraded for freight services
 passenger hubs
 freight hubs, including inter-modal terminals
 lines connecting the components mentioned above

This infrastructure includes traffic management, tracking, and navigation systems.

The rolling stock may comprise all the stock likely to travel on all or part of the trans-European conventional rail network.

The EU has decided on nine "core network corridors" within the TEN-T framework, which are:
 The Scandinavian–Mediterranean Corridor: Hamina–Helsinki–Turku, Stockholm/Oslo–Copenhagen/Rostock–Hamburg/Berlin–Kassel/Leipzig–Nuremberg-Regensburg–Munich–Innsbruck–Verona–Florence–Rome–Naples–Messina/Bari–Palermo/Taranto–Valletta
 The North Sea–Baltic Corridor: Rotterdam–Amsterdam/Brussels–Hannover–Berlin–Warsaw–Kaunas–Riga–Tallinn
 The North Sea–Mediterranean Corridor: Cork–Dublin–Belfast, Glasgow/Edinburgh/Holyhead–Manchester–Birmingham–London–Brussels–Luxembourg–Strasbourg/Nancy–Lyon–Marseille/Montpellier
 The Baltic–Adriatic Corridor: Gdańsk/Szczecin–Warsaw/Poznań–Łódź/Wrocław–Katowice–Ostrava–Brno/Bratislava–Vienna–Ljubljana/Udine–Venice–Bologna–Ravenna
 The Orient/East–Mediterranean Corridor: Hamburg/Bremen/Rostock–Hannover–Leipzig/Berlin–Dresden–Prague–Vienna/Bratislava–Budapest–Timișoara–Sofia–Burgas/Athens–Patras/Limassol–Nicosia
 The Rhine–Alpine Corridor: Amsterdam/Rotterdam/Ostend–Düsseldorf/Brussels–Cologne–Frankfurt–Basel–Bern–Novara/Milan–Genoa
 The Atlantic Corridor: Lisbon/Porto/Algeciras–Salamanca/Madrid–San Sebastián–Bordeaux–Paris–Le Havre/Mannheim/Strasbourg
 The Rhine–Danube Corridor: Strasbourg–Frankfurt–Prague–Kosice/Strasbourg–Stuttgart–Munich–Vienna–Bratislava–Budapest–Timișoara–Bucharest–Costanța
 The Mediterranean Corridor: Algeciras–Seville/Málaga–Madrid/Valencia–Barcelona–Montpellier–Lyon–Turin–Milan–Venice–Ljubljana–Zagreb–Budapest
The listed routes are approximate and there are branches on several of them.

See also
High-speed rail in Europe
First Railway Package and Second Railway Package, related EU legislation

References

Trans-European Rail network